Arroz negro ("black rice") is a Mexican dish made with rice, in which its dark color comes from black bean broth. The dark broth is made by cooking black beans with onion and butter in sufficient water. Rice is fried with garlic, then the bean broth is added, as well as epazote, serrano pepper, and salt. The rice is simmered until tender. 

It should not be confused with Black rice as a variety of rice, rather than a recipe, such as Indonesian black rice, Philippine balatinaw rice, and Thai jasmine black rice, these have natural color while the Mexican Arroz negro obtains this color from the black bean broth.

Origins 
The traditional recipe comes from southern regions as Oaxaca and Campeche. And of course every family prepares it in a different way, but the main ingredients for the arroz negro are rice, black bean broth, onion, epazote, serrano, pepper and salt.

Related dishes 
There are many other related dishes to the arroz negro. Some of them are the risotto nero (Venice, Italy), octopus with black rice and shrimp, and some others.

See also
 List of Mexican dishes

References
https://www.youtube.com/watch?v=T2KvZ_wJmwg

Sources 
 Peña Vásquez, Cuauhtémoc. (2010). ¡Mucho gusto! Gastronomía y turismo cultural en el Istmo de Tehuantepec. Educal. . 
 Del Castillo, María. (1966). Cocina mexicana. Ed. Olimpo.

External links
 Process to cook arroz negro

Mexican rice dishes